Janelle Anyanonu is an American politician serving as a member of the New Mexico House of Representatives for the 19th district. Elected in November 2022, she assumed office on January 1, 2023.

Early life and education 
The daughter of Nigerian immigrants, Anyanonu was raised in Albuquerque, New Mexico. She graduated from Manzano High School and earned a Bachelor of Science degree in applied sciences from Wayland Baptist University.

Career 
Anyanonu worked as an office manager and served as a member of the New Mexico Black Central Organizing Committee. A 2020 graduate of the Emerge America program in New Mexico, Anyanonu was elected to the New Mexico House of Representatives in November 2022.

References 

Living people
New Mexico Democrats
Members of the New Mexico House of Representatives
Women state legislators in New Mexico
American politicians of Nigerian descent
People from Albuquerque, New Mexico
Politicians from Albuquerque, New Mexico
Wayland Baptist University alumni
Year of birth missing (living people)